The 2017 Tour de Romandie was a road cycling stage race that took place between 25 and 30 April in Romandie, Switzerland. It was the 71st edition of the Tour de Romandie and the nineteenth event of the 2017 UCI World Tour.

The race was won on the final day by Australia's Richie Porte, who overhauled a 19-second deficit to British rider Simon Yates over the  time trial, and won the race for the first time. Yates – riding for the  squad – was able to finish second overall, holding off 's Primož Roglič of Slovenia, who won the final time trial and finished just five seconds in arrears of Yates at the finish.

Participating teams
As the Tour de Romandie was a UCI World Tour event, all eighteen UCI WorldTeams were invited automatically and were obliged to enter a team in the race.

Route
The race itinerary was announced on 10 December 2016.

Stages

Prologue
25 April 2017 — Aigle, individual time trial (ITT)

Stage 1
26 April 2017 — Aigle to Champéry,

Stage 2
27 April 2017 — Aigle to Bulle,

Stage 3
28 April 2017 — Payerne to Payerne,

Stage 4
29 April 2017 — Domdidier to Leysin,

Stage 5
30 April 2017 — Lausanne to Lausanne, individual time trial (ITT)

Classification leadership table
In the Tour de Romandie, four jerseys were awarded. The general classification was calculated by adding up each cyclist's finishing times on each stage. Time bonuses were awarded to the first three finishers on road stages (stages 1–4): the stage winner won a ten-second bonus, with six and four seconds for the second and third riders respectively. No bonus seconds were awarded at intermediate sprints. The leader of the general classification received a yellow jersey. This classification was considered the most important of the Tour, and the winner of the classification was considered the winner of the race. The young rider classification was based on the general classification: the highest-ranked rider born after 1 January 1993, was the leader of the classification and wore a white jersey.

There was a mountains classification; the leader of this competition wore a pink, black and blue jersey. Over the road stages of the race, there were 16 classified climbs, each of which was ranked as first-category, second-category or third-category. The first riders to cross the summit of the climbs won points towards the mountain classification. On first-category climbs, the first five riders won points with the first of these winning 12 points. Points were also awarded to the first five riders across the summit of second-category climbs, though the winner only won 8 points. On third-category climbs, only the first four riders won points, with the first rider winning five points. For the climbs near the stage finishes at Champéry and Leysin, double points were awarded.

There was also a points classification. In the points classification, cyclists received points for finishing in the top 15 in a stage. On the flat mass-start stages; for winning a stage, a rider earned 50 points, with 30 for second, 20 for third and so on down to two points for 15th place. In the individual time trials and mountainous stages, points were awarded to the top 15 riders, with 30 points for the winner, 25 for second, 22 for third and so on down to two points for 15th place. Points towards the classification could also be accrued at intermediate sprint points during each stage; on each of the road stages, there were two intermediate sprints. The first rider in these sprints won 15 points; the second rider won 10 points; the third rider won 6 points. The winner of the classification won a green jersey.

The final individual classification was a combativity prize. After each road stage, a jury chose the rider on the basis of sportsmanship and effort in the stage. The rider was awarded a red dossard (race number) for the following stage. After the final stage, the jury chose the most combative rider of the race overall. The final classification was a team classification. This was calculated by adding together the times of the best three riders on each team in each stage.

Notes

References

Sources

External links
 

2017
2017 UCI World Tour
2017 in Swiss sport
April 2017 sports events in Europe